Plasmatronics is a company, founded by former Air Force Weapons Laboratory (now Phillips Laboratory) scientist Dr. Alan E. Hill, which produced a plasma speaker design.  This was first demonstrated at the 1978 Winter Consumer Electronics Show.

The product used a conventional dynamic loudspeaker with an integrated amplifier for low frequencies.  For a tweeter it used a plasma speaker as a near-massless driver.  Uniquely, to prevent ozone and NOx emissions it sourced helium from a tank in the back  of the unit.

While praised for accurate sound reproduction at demonstrations, the system had a number of disadvantages, including high cost and periodic handling of heavy compressed helium cylinders.

External links
website dedicated to the plasmatronics loudspeaker
The Art of Speaker Design

Loudspeaker manufacturers
Audio equipment manufacturers of the United States